Shady Grove is a census-designated place (CDP) in McIntosh County, Oklahoma, United States. The population was 199 at the 2010 census, a decrease of 14.4 percent from 229 in 2000.  This is not to be confused with the similarly-named Shady Grove in Cherokee County, or the Shady Grove in Pawnee County.

Geography
Shady Grove is located at  (35.440054, -95.411409).

The town is on Interstate 40 as well as U.S. Route 266, east of Checotah.  

Lake Eufaula, Oklahoma’s largest lake, is to the south and west, while Lake Eufaula State Park is about 20 miles west-southwest.

Demographics
At the 2000 census, there were 185 people, 73 households, and 58 families residing in the CDP. There were 81 housing units at an average density of 10.1/sq mi (3.9/km2). The racial makeup of the CDP was 68.65% White, 20.00% Native American, 0.54% Asian, and 10.81% from two or more races. Hispanic or Latino of any race were 0.54% of the population.

There were 73 households, of which 30.1% had children under the age of 18 living with them, 74.0% were married couples living together, 2.7% had a female householder with no husband present, and 20.5% were non-families. 20.5% of all households were made up of individuals, and 11.0% had someone living alone who was 65 years of age or older. The average household size was 2.53 and the average family size was 2.91.

The age distribution was 22.2% under the age of 18, 4.9% from 18 to 24, 25.4% from 25 to 44, 34.1% from 45 to 64, and 13.5% who were 65 years of age or older. The median age was 43 years. For every 100 females, there were 110.2 males. For every 100 females age 18 and over, there were 111.8 males.

The median household income was $53,125, and the median family income was $62,656. Males had a median income of $23,125 versus $22,734 for females. The per capita income for the CDP was $18,820. About 11.5% of families and 5.4% of the population were below the poverty line, including none of those under the age of eighteen or sixty five or over.

Notable person
Musician Jody Reynolds grew up in the community.

References

Census-designated places in McIntosh County, Oklahoma
Census-designated places in Oklahoma